Portulacaria fruticulosa (previously Ceraria fruticulosa or Ceraria schaeferi) is a succulent plant found on the border between Namibia and South Africa.

Description
It is a soft-wooded deciduous shrub with flat, round succulent leaves. 
It bears unisexual flowers on sessile inflorescences.

Within the genus Portulacaria, it is most closely related to its tiny sister-species, Portulacaria pygmaea.

References

fructiculosa
Flora of South Africa
Flora of Namibia